Nong's Khao Man Gai is a Thai restaurant located in Portland, Oregon which primarily serves Khao man gai, a chicken and rice dish originating in Southeast Asia.

History
Nong's Khao Man Gai was founded by Nong Poonsukwattana in 2009. Poonsukwattana emigrated to Oregon from Bangkok, Thailand in 2003. She arrived with $70 and a suitcase. Poonsukwattana began working as a waitress at several restaurants in Beaverton, Oregon before eventually receiving a position at Pok Pok, a Thai restaurant in Portland. At Pok Pok, she was the only Thai cook. Poonsukwattana was later able to purchase a food cart off Craigslist for $1,300, and, in 2009, opened Nong's Khao Man Gai as a food cart at Southwest 10th Avenue and Alder Street, serving chicken and rice every day until the product ran out.

The first brick and mortar restaurant is located in southeast Portland's Buckman neighborhood.

In 2014, the restaurant was featured on Chopped.

See also

 List of Thai restaurants

References

External links

 

2009 establishments in Oregon
Buckman, Portland, Oregon
Food carts in Portland, Oregon
Restaurants established in 2009
Southwest Portland, Oregon
Thai restaurants in Portland, Oregon